"I Don't Do Surprises" is the debut single by Australian singer Axle Whitehead, from his debut album Losing Sleep. "I Don't Do Surprises" has managed a peak of #8 on the ARIA Singles Chart, and is certified Gold by ARIA. It has so far spent a total of fifteen weeks in the top 50. "I Don't Do Surprises" has also reached a peak position of #2 on the Australasian Singles Chart.

I Don't Do Surprises has been nominated for a 2009 APRA Award for Most Played Australian Work.

I Don't Do Surprises was used as part of a television advertisement of Channel Seven's show, Home and Away.

Track listing

Charts

Weekly charts

Year-end charts

Release history

References

Notes
 The Australian singles chart peak was retrieved on 29 June 2008

Axle Whitehead songs
2008 singles
Songs written by Robert Conley (music producer)
2008 songs
Sony BMG singles